Ronny Arendt (born November 24, 1980) is a German former professional ice hockey player who most notably played for Adler Mannheim in the Deutsche Eishockey Liga (DEL). He also played with the Berlin Capitals and Augsburger Panther.

After completing his 12th season with Adler Mannheim in the 2016–17 season, Arendt announced his retirement from professional hockey after 19 seasons on March 28, 2017. He would remain with the club, in a physical trainer role for the playing team.

Career statistics

Regular season and playoffs

International

References

External links

1980 births
Living people
Adler Mannheim players
Augsburger Panther players
Ours de Villard-de-Lans players
German ice hockey forwards
People from Bad Muskau
Sportspeople from Saxony